Humbird is an unincorporated census-designated place in the Town of Mentor in Clark County, Wisconsin, United States. It is located on U.S. Route 12 north-northwest of Merrillan. As of the 2010 census, its population was 266. Humbird has a post office with ZIP code 54746.

History
Humbird was founded by Jacob Humbird, who was born at Ligonier, Pennsylvania on July 31, 1811. The second of five children of Solomon and Susan Humbert, Jacob was married to Eleanor McKee in 1835. They had four sons and four daughters. Jacob and his brother pursued careers in railroad building. He built Dom Pedro Secundo Railroad in Brazil from Rio de Janeiro to the interior of the country. In 1867 Humbird and D. A. Baldwin built the main line of the West Wisconsin Railroad from Elroy to Hudson. The tracks were laid to Humbird in late 1869. The depot opened for business on January 1, 1870.

Geography
Humbird contains a pond, a bluff, farm land, recreational land, and several ATV trails. Although named Emerson Lake, it is commonly called Humbird Pond.

Education
School District of Alma Center-Humbird-Merrillan operates public schools.

References

External links
Alma Center-Humbird-Merrillan School District
Town Of Mentor - Wisconsin

Census-designated places in Clark County, Wisconsin
Census-designated places in Wisconsin